The 2017 Junior World Fencing Championships were held in Plovdiv, Bulgaria at the International Fair Plovdiv from 1 to 10 April.

Medal summary

Junior events

Men's events

Women's events

Cadet events

Men's events

Women's events

Mixed events

Medal table

References
 fencingplovdiv.com, official website of the competition
 Full Results

Junior World Fencing Championships
2017 in fencing
International fencing competitions hosted by Bulgaria
2017 in Bulgarian sport
Sport in Plovdiv